LTBR may refer to:

Lymphotoxin beta receptor, a cell surface receptor for lymphotoxin involved in apoptosis and cytokine release
LTBR, the ICAO airport code for Yenişehir Airport, Bursa Province, Turkey